There have been three Baronetcies created for the family of Walker, later known as Forestier-Walker. The original title was in the Baronetage of England and the other two in the Baronetage of the United Kingdom. The earliest and the latest are both extinct, but one baronetcy is still extant.

History

The Walker Baronetcy was created in the Baronetage of England in 1679, for Sir George Walker of Bushey Hall in the County of Hertford. Sir George, the first baronet, was the son of Sir Walter Walker, the legal adviser to Queen Catherine of Braganza from 1661, who received a knighthood for his services. Sir Walter's grandson was named after him and, in turn, inherited the Walker baronetcy. This Sir Walter, the second baronet, was the last holder of the title: upon his death without an heir, the Bushey Hall baronetcy became extinct.

The United Kingdom Walker – later Forestier-Walker – Baronetcy, of Castleton in the County of Monmouth, was created on 28 March 1835, for the soldier George Walker. The second baronet assumed by deed poll the additional surname of Forestier. Another member of the family, George Edmond Lushington Walker, fourth son of the first baronet, was a major general in the Army.

The Forestier-Walker Baronetcy, of Rhiwderin in the County of Monmouth, was created in the Baronetage of the United Kingdom on 9 July 1929 for the Conservative politician Sir Leolin Forestier-Walker. The title became extinct on his death in 1934.

Walker Baronets, of Bushey Hall (1679)
Sir George Walker, 1st Baronet
Sir Walter Walker, 2nd Baronet

Forestier-Walker Baronets, of Castleton (1835)
Sir George Townshend Walker, 1st Baronet (1764–1842)
Sir George Ferdinand Radziwill Forestier-Walker, 2nd Baronet (1825–1896)
Sir George Ferdinand Radziwill Forestier-Walker, 3rd Baronet (1855–1933)
Sir George Ferdinand Forestier-Walker, 4th Baronet (1899–1976)
Sir Clive Radziwill Forestier-Walker, 5th Baronet (1922–1983)
Sir Michael Leolin Forestier-Walker, 6th Baronet (born 1949)

The heir apparent to the baronetcy is Joseph Alan Forestier-Walker (born 1992), only son of the 6th Baronet.

Forestier-Walker Baronets, of Rhiwderin (1929)
Sir (Charles) Leolin Forestier-Walker, 1st Baronet (1866–1934)

See also
Sir Frederick Forestier-Walker, Governor of Gibraltar

References  

Baronetcies in the Baronetage of the United Kingdom
Extinct baronetcies in the Baronetage of England
Extinct baronetcies in the Baronetage of the United Kingdom
1679 establishments in England